

449001–449100 

|-bgcolor=#f2f2f2
| colspan=4 align=center | 
|}

449101–449200 

|-bgcolor=#f2f2f2
| colspan=4 align=center | 
|}

449201–449300 

|-bgcolor=#f2f2f2
| colspan=4 align=center | 
|}

449301–449400 

|-bgcolor=#f2f2f2
| colspan=4 align=center | 
|}

449401–449500 

|-bgcolor=#f2f2f2
| colspan=4 align=center | 
|}

449501–449600 

|-bgcolor=#f2f2f2
| colspan=4 align=center | 
|}

449601–449700 

|-bgcolor=#f2f2f2
| colspan=4 align=center | 
|}

449701–449800 

|-bgcolor=#f2f2f2
| colspan=4 align=center | 
|}

449801–449900 

|-bgcolor=#f2f2f2
| colspan=4 align=center | 
|}

449901–450000 

|-id=922
| 449922 Bailey ||  || Ronald W. Bailey (born 1958) supported mission operations for NASA spacecraft including Topex, Jason and WISE/NEOWISE in a career that spanned more than 35 years. || 
|}

References 

449001-450000